This is a list of Super Bowl head coaches.

Super Bowl head coaches

(Win number in parenthesis). [Loss number in brackets]. Click on heading arrows to sort table.

Coaches with multiple Super Bowl appearances

The following NFL head coaches have coached in two or more Super Bowls. Of eligible coaches not in the Hall of Fame, only two have had three or more appearances: Mike Holmgren and Dan Reeves. There are only two eligible coaches with multiple wins to not be inducted into the Hall of Fame: George Seifert and Mike Shanahan. 

 Sort chart by clicking arrows by heading.
In descending order, the tiebreakers are – 1) Better win percentage 2) Earliest Super Bowl

See also

NFL head coach playoff records
History of NFL Championships
List of NFL champions
List of quarterbacks with multiple Super Bowl starts
List of Super Bowl appearances
List of Pro Football Hall of Fame inductees

References

S
Head coaches